Bakhtiari (also Romanized as Bakhtīārī and Bakhtiyari; also known as Bāgh-e Bakhtīārī and Bagh-i-Bakhtīāri) is a village in Chahak Rural District, in the Central District of Khatam County, Yazd Province, Iran. At the 2006 census, its population was 313, in 78 families.

References 

Populated places in Khatam County